Boronia boliviensis, commonly known as Bolivia Hill boronia is a plant in the citrus family, Rutaceae and is endemic to a small area on the Northern Tablelands of New South Wales. It is a strongly scented shrub with pinnate leaves, deep pink flowers in spring and with its young branches covered with fine, yellow hairs. It is only known from higher parts of the Bolivia Range where it grows on granite outcrops.

Description
The branches, when young are densely covered with fine, yellowish, branched hairs but become glabrous with age. Its leaves are dark green and bipinnate with between 5 and 9 leaflets.

There are 8 curved stamens tipped with yellow anthers. Flowering occurs mainly from September to November but flowers are often present in other months.

Taxonomy and naming
Boronia boliviensis was discovered in 1995 and first formally described by John Beaumont Williams and John Thomas Hunter in 2006 and the description was published in Telopea. The specific epithet (boliviensis) refers to the location Bolivia Hill, where all known specimens of the species have been found.

Distribution and habitat
It often occurs in association with Leucopogon neoanglicus  and Micromyrtus sessilis.

Conservation
Boronia boliviensis is classified as "endangered" by the Scientific Committee, established by the Threatened Species Conservation Act (NSW). In 1999 the total population of mature plants was estimated to be 1,000.

References

boliviensis
Flora of New South Wales
Plants described in 2006